Farewell Romance is a romance novel by the British writer Gilbert Frankau which was first published in 1936. It has been described as a "tear-jerker".

References

Bibliography
 Angus McLaren. Reproduction by Design: Sex, Robots, Trees, and Test-Tube Babies in Interwar Britain. University of Chicago Press, 2012.

1936 British novels
Novels set in England
Novels by Gilbert Frankau
British romance novels